Dimal (before April 2021: Ura Vajgurore) is a municipality in Berat County, central Albania. It was formed at the 2015 local government reform by the merger of the former municipalities Cukalat, Kutalli, Poshnjë and Ura Vajgurore, that became municipal units. The seat of the municipality is the town Ura Vajgurore. The total population is 27,295 (2011 census), in a total area of 156.65 km2.

References

 
Municipalities in Berat County
Towns in Albania
Populated places established in 2015